Navali also spelled as Nowli is a village in the Lingasugur taluk of Raichur district in the Indian state of Karnataka. Navali is located west to Lingasugur town. Great Vachanakara Sri Shankara Dasimayya lived in Navali.

Demographics
As of 2001 India census, Navali had a population of 730 with 372 males and 358 females and 144 Households.

See also
Pura, Kushtagi
Tavaragera
Kanakagiri
Lingasugur
Sindhanur
Raichur

References

Villages in Raichur district